Hrubeš is a Czech surname. Notable people with the surname include:

Josef Hrubeš (1916–?), Czech boxer
Karel Hrubeš (born 1993), Czech footballer

See also
Horst Hrubesch (born 1951), German football player and manager

Czech-language surnames